IvyWise is a for-profit New York-based firm of educational consultants that assists students pursuing admission to college. IvyWise counselors also work with students applying to nursery school, elementary school, high school/boarding school, and graduate or professional schools.

Their services range from primary and secondary school admissions to college counseling for high school students and even graduate, law, and medical school admissions. They also provide tutoring, standardized test prep, and boast a wide range of free resources.

The company was founded in 1998 by Dr. Katherine L. Cohen after she saw firsthand, "how students were presenting themselves and the mistakes they were making, and I kept thinking, well, I could help these kids from the other side…" Cohen then went on to found IvyWise, which quickly rose to become one of the world's leading education consultancy businesses. It is frequently named as a Top College Consultancy in the World; its most recent being a #1 ranking within the 2020-2021 College Admissions Consultants. Other notable rankings include those by Academic Influence, Entrepreneur, The Best of Manhattan: Private Tutors, and The Best of Manhattan: Best Admissions Counselor. IvyWise's website also boasts a plethora of promising reviews from parents, students, and other testimonials.

Founder

Dr. Katherine L. Cohen graduated magna cum laude from Brown University and received two master's degrees and a Ph.D. in Spanish Literature from Yale University. Dr. Cohen wrote The Truth About Getting In (Hyperion, 2002) and Rock Hard Apps (Hyperion, 2003). She received certification in College Admission Counseling from U.C.L.A. Extension. Prior to founding IvyWise, she was as an intern college counselor at Palisades Charter High School and a reader in the Yale University Office of Admissions. She also taught SAT test prep classes for The Princeton Review, an SAT prep company.

Her entrepreneurial spirit stemmed from a young age, having started working as young as 15 years old at a local wine and cheese shop. She was recruited by The Princeton Review shortly thereafter, where she began teaching SAT prep whilst still in high school, herself.

After graduating university, she decided to start her own tutoring business, which soon evolved into IvyWise as it's known today.

Counselors
IvyWise hosts an impressive line of academic counselors, whose collective counseling experience totals over 300 years, as of February, 2022. Each counselor has evaluated thousands of applicants and sat in committee. Their backgrounds range from former admissions officers at Massachusetts Institute of Technology (MIT) and Harvard to former Deans of Admissions at a wide range of other impressive schools like Yale University, Princeton University, and Sarah Lawrence College, to name just a few.

IvyWise in the News
One of IvyWise's first media appearances was a small, humble blurb published in Forbes over a decade ago, which can now be accessed online.

More recently, the company is frequently cited as an expert source for education-related news and updates, particularly in regards to COVID-19. The company and its members are quoted by organizations like Forbes, Fox, The New York Times, and on numerous occasions by U.S. News and Inside Higher Ed. Institutions like Yale University and Lafayette College have also referenced the company in their school papers.

Professional Affiliations
All IvyWise counselors adhere to the National Association for College Admission Counseling (NACAC) Statement of Principles of Good Practice and the Independent Educational Consultants Association Principles of Good Practice. Dr. Katherine Cohen is a member of both NACAC and the Independent Educational Consultants Association. According to the New York Times, fewer than one of every five admissions consultants can claim to be an association member of the Independent Educational Consultants Association.

History
IvyWise was founded in 1998 by Dr. Katherine L. Cohen. She started the business in her apartment with $5,000.

In early 2002, Dr. Katherine Cohen published a book, The Truth About Getting In, that guides readers through the college admissions process according to the IvyWise methodology that Dr. Cohen developed. She published a second book entitled Rock Hard Apps: How to Write a Killer College Application in 2003.

In 2004, the parents of Kaavya Viswanathan reportedly engaged IvyWise for its assistance in college counseling services. Viswanathan applied to and was accepted at Harvard University. Viswanathan's novel, projected to be a bestseller by its publisher, described an academically oriented Indian American girl's efforts to become more "well-rounded" in hopes of boosting her chances of admission to Harvard. Cohen put her in touch with the William Morris Agency, which secured a book and movie deal. The novel was published in 2006. It was later revealed that many of the book's passages had been directly plagiarized from other fiction sources. The furor over this incident inadvertently raised IvyWise's profile and increased the controversy surrounding the hiring of high-priced consultants.

Controversies
IvyWise is a private educational consulting firm and thus, is often included in news stories about the controversy surrounding the use of private educational consultants and the issue of a level playing field for all students.

The firm was also involved in the Kaavya Viswanathan plagiarism controversy, as the organization that referred Viswanathan to the William Morris Agency and 17th Street Productions.

See also
 College admissions in the United States
 Transfer admissions in the United States

References

External links
IvyWise

University and college admissions